Gashimov Memorial is a chess supertournament played in Azerbaijan in memory of Vugar Gashimov (1986–2014).

Winners

2014
The Gashimov Memorial 2014 took place in the Haydar Aliev Centre in Shamkir City from 16 April to 30 April 2014, consisting of two tournaments, with invited players Magnus Carlsen, Hikaru Nakamura, Sergey Karjakin, Fabiano Caruana, Shakhriyar Mamedyarov, and Teimour Radjabov making up the A Tournament. The Elo average for the tournament was 2780, making it a Category 22 event and one of the highest rated tournaments of all time.

The A Tournament was held as a double round robin, with each player facing the other with both colours, while the B Tournament was held as a single round robin.

The total prize fund for the A tournament was €100,000, while the prize fund for the B tournament was €30,000.

In the A Tournament, in spite of losing consecutive games early on, Magnus Carlsen won after a last round White win over Fabiano Caruana who finished second.

In the B Tournament, Pavel Eljanov won two and drew one of his last three games to take first place.

2015
The second edition of Shamkir Chess took place 16–25 April 2015.

World champion Magnus Carlsen, former world champion Viswanathan Anand and Vladimir Kramnik competed in the tournament in Azerbaijan, as well as Fabiano Caruana, Anish Giri, Wesley So, Maxime Vachier-Lagrave, Shakhriyar Mamedyarov, Michael Adams, and the Azerbaijan Champion Rauf Mamedov.

The tournament's total prize fund was €100,000.

Magnus Carlsen won the event with 7 points out of 9.

2016
The 3rd Shamkir Chess Tournament took place from May 26 to June 4, 2016. All ratings below are from the May 2016 FIDE Rating Lists.

Both Mamedyarov and Caruana were equal after nine rounds. Mamedyarov won the ensuing tiebreak rounds. The first two games were 10+3, and the second two games were 5+3.

2017

2018

The total prize fund of the fifth edition of Shamkir Chess tournament was again set to €100,000, with the winner receiving €30,000. With an average rating of 2768, it was a category XXI tournament.

One week before the beginning of the tournament, former world champion Vladimir Kramnik sent a letter to the organization committee stating he would not participate as planned, as he desired a rest after the Candidates Tournament held in March. The organizers replaced Kramnik with the No. 1 Polish player Radosław Wojtaszek (2744).

In the last round of the tournament, Magnus Carlsen and Ding Liren faced each other. They were in first and second place, respectively, and Carlsen as white needed only a draw to reclaim the title after two years of absence from the tournament. The game was a theoretical Four Knights Game. It was clear that Ding did not want to risk his runner-up position by attempting to defeat Carlsen as black, and the game was drawn within 20 minutes. As a result, Carlsen won the tournament for the third time.

2019

2021
The 2021 edition was changed to a rapid/blitz event, and held in Baku, a departure from the tournament being traditionally held in Shamkir.  Fabiano Caruana won the event in an armageddon playoff with Richard Rapport.

References

External links
 Vugar Gashimov Memorial 2014 
 Broadcast of the Shamkir 2019 on worldchess.com 

Chess competitions
Chess in Azerbaijan
Chess memorial tournaments
International sports competitions hosted by Azerbaijan
Shamkir District
2014 establishments in Azerbaijan
Recurring sporting events established in 2014